Caloptilia prosticta is a moth of the family Gracillariidae. It is known from Madagascar, Nigeria, the Seychelles, South Africa and Sri Lanka.

Host plants
Host plants of this species are :  Cajanus cajani, Vigna unguiculata and Rhynchosia caribaea (Fabaceae)

References

prosticta
Moths of Asia
Moths of Africa
Moths described in 1909